John 1:26 is the twenty-sixth verse in the first chapter of the Gospel of John in the New Testament of the Christian Bible.

Content
In the original Greek according to Westcott-Hort, this verse is:
Ἀπεκρίθη αὐτοῖς ὁ Ἰωάννης λέγων, Ἐγὼ βαπτίζω ἐν ὕδατι· μέσος δὲ ὑμῶν ἕστηκεν ὃν ὑμεῖς οὐκ οἴδατε.  

In the King James Version of the Bible the text reads:
John answered them, saying, I baptize with water: but there standeth one among you, whom ye know not;

The New International Version translates the passage as:
"I baptize with water," John replied, "but among you stands one you do not know".

Analysis
Lapide comments on John's words, "there standeth one, etc." stating that it is as if John said, "Christ is living in the midst of you, and yet you do not know Him. That is, you see him as a mere man and do not perceive that he is the Messiah."

Commentary from the Church Fathers
Gregory the Great: "A saint, even when perversely questioned, is never diverted from the pursuit of goodness. Thus John to the words of envy opposes the words of life: John answered them, saying, I indeed baptize with water."

Origen: "For how would the question, Why then baptizest thou, be replied to in any other way, than by setting forth the carnal nature of his own baptism?"

Gregory the Great: "John baptizeth not with the Spirit, but with water; not being able to remit sins, he washes the bodies of the baptized with water, but not their souls with pardon. Why then doth he baptize, when he doth not remit sins by baptism? To maintain his character of forerunner. As his birth preceded our Lord’s, so doth his baptism precede our Lord’s baptism. And he who was the forerunner of Christ in His preaching, is forerunner also in His baptism, which was the imitation of that Sacrament. And withal he announces the mystery of our redemption, saying that He, the Redeemer, is standing in the midst of men, and they know it not: There standeth one among you, whom ye know not: for our Lord, when He appeared in the flesh, was visible in body, but in majesty invisible."

Chrysostom: "One among you. It was fitting that Christ should mix with the people, and be one of the many, showing every where His humility. Whom ye know not; i. e. not, in the most absolute and certain sense; not, who He is, and whence Ho is."

Augustine: "In His low estate He was not seen; and therefore the candle was lighted."

Theophylact of Ohrid: "Or it was, that our Lord was in the midst of the Pharisees; and they not knowing Him. For they thought that they knew the Scriptures, and therefore, inasmuch as our Lord was pointed out there, He was in the midst of them, i. e. in their hearts. But they knew Him not, inasmuch as they understood not the Scriptures. Or take another interpretation. He was in the midst of them, as mediator between God and man, wishing to bring them, the Pharisees, to God. But they knew Him not."

Chrysostom: "As if he said, Do not think that every thing is contained in my baptism; for if my baptism were perfect, another would not come after me with another baptism. This baptism of mine is but an introduction to the other, and will soon pass away, like a shadow, or an image. There is One coming after me to establish the truth: and therefore this is not a perfect baptism; for, if it were, there would be no room for a second: and therefore he adds, Who is made before me: i. e. is more honourable, more lofty."

References

External links
Other translations of John 1:26 at BibleHub

01:26
Baptism